The J.League Top Scorer is awarded by the J.League to the top scoring player of the season.

Wins by club

See also
J.League awards
Japanese football champions, for Japan Soccer League predecessors.

References

 ULTRAZONE Website : All-Time Award Winners 

J.League trophies and awards
Japan
Goal
Annual events in Japan
Association football player non-biographical articles